Mona Lisa was a French progressive/symphonic rock band active in the 1970s, playing rock with theatrical vocals in the vein of Ange. In 1998, after almost twenty years of inactivity, the group reformed with three-quarters of the members of Versailles. Notable members were Dominique Le Guennec, Francis Poulet, Jean-Paul Pierson, Pascal Jardon and Jean-Luc Martin.

Releases
 1974 - L'escapade
 1975 - Grimaces
 1976 - Le petit violon de Monsieur Grégoire
 1977 - Avant qu'il ne soit trop tard
 1978 - Vers demain
 1998 - De L'Ombre à la Lumière
 2001 - Progfest 2000

References

French progressive rock groups